Sergey Kuzin (born 18 January 1971) is a Russian  motorcycle speedway rider who was a member of Russia team at 2001 and 2002 Speedway World Cup.

Honours

World Championships 
 Team World Championship (Speedway World Team Cup and Speedway World Cup)
 2001 -  - 8th place (5 pts in Race-off)
 2002 -  - 9th place (2 pts in Event 3)

European Championships 

 Individual European Championship
 2001 -  Heusden Zolder - 4th place (12 pts)
 European Club Champions' Cup
 1999 -  Diedenbergen - 3rd place (2 pts)

See also 
 Russia national speedway team

References

External links 
 (en) (pl) Sergey Kuzin at www.lubusports.pl

Russian speedway riders
1971 births
Living people
People from Balakovo
Sportspeople from Saratov Oblast